Mary Epworth is an English singer, songwriter, and composer.

In 2012, Epworth released her debut album, Dream Life. Strong radio support included singles "Black Doe" and "Long Gone", playlisted on BBC Radio 6 Music, and "Black Doe" picked as Zane Lowe's Hottest Record in the World on BBC Radio 1.

Career 
In 2008, Epworth released her debut single "The Saddle Song" on 7. It was included in a top 100 poll by German Rolling Stone magazine readers. She also appeared at "The Lady: A Tribute to Sandy Denny" concert at Southbank Centre. She was backed by Bellowhead in a bill that also included Marc Almond, Jim Moray, Dave Swarbrick and PP Arnold.

In 2009, Epworth took part in a St Georges Day celebration concert at Cecil Sharp House and also the Camden Crawl. Epworth was interviewed by Tom Cox for The Sunday Times on 2 August 2009, and she released her second single "Black Doe" on Hand of Glory Records.

Epworth performed in Queen Elizabeth Hall, Southbank Centre, on 26 February 2010.

Her debut album Dream Life was released in June 2012, again on Hand of Glory Records in the UK. She garnered the singer-songwriter airtime on BBC 6 Music and Radio 1, as well as appearances at Bristol Ladyfest, Hop Farm Festival and Bestival in the same year. The album was released by Highline Records in North America in the Spring of 2015.

Her brother, Paul Epworth, is a music producer, musician, and songwriter.

In July 2013, her song 'Long Gone' was featured on Welcome to Night Vale as the Weather for the episode "Faceless Old Woman".

Epworth's festival performances in 2013 included SXSW, The Great Escape, and Festival No. 6.

Epworth released a one-off single, September, in 2013, with accompanying video. The single was premiered on 22 August 2013 by BBC Radio 6 Music on the Radcliffe and Maconie show, and Epworth was there as a studio guest for an interview. The single was added to the BBC Radio 6 Music playlist, and Epworth was live in session with Lauren Laverne on 30 September.

In 2014, Epworth embarked on a 20-date UK and European tour supporting US podcast phenomenon Welcome to Night Vale for their stage show, which also saw Epworth joining them during their show. The tour included four London shows, two at Union Chapel and two at Shepherd's Bush Empire. This was followed in 2015 by a 36-date US tour with Welcome to Night Vale.

Also in 2014, Mary Epworth took part in a one-off collaboration curated by Steve Levine and comprising Epworth with Boy George, Bernard Butler, Tim Burgess, Mark King, Hollie Cook, and Natalie McCool. Billed as Steve Levine's Assembly Point Sessions, the show took place at St George's Hall as part of the Liverpool International Music Festival and was hosted by BBC Radio 6 Music's Chris Hawkins.

The 2014 Christmas compilation album Christmas Joy in Full Measure opens with Epworth's track "The Wolf and the Woods", with other contributors including Young Knives, The Webb Brothers, and Kiran Leonard. The album was awarded a 8/10 by the NME . Epworth, Young Knives, and Kiran Leonard were the special guests on BBC Radio 6 Music's Radcliffe and Maconie show on New years eve.

2016 saw Epworth scoring the podcast Within the Wires, from the team behind Welcome to Night Vale and Alice Isn't Dead.

In September 2016, Epworth was chosen by Tony Visconti to be the first artist to record with him at Visconti Studio, a new facility at Kingston University London.

In February 2017, Rob da Bank's record label Sunday Best announced they had signed Mary Epworth and will be releasing her second album later this year.

Discography

Singles 
 "The Saddle Song" (2008)
 "Black Doe" (2009)
 "September" (2013)
 "Snow Queen" (2014)
 "Me Swimming" (2017)
 "Surprise Yourself" (2017)

Albums 
 Dream Life (2012 UK / 2015 USA)
 Elytral (2017)

Compilations 
 Christmas Joy In Full Measure (2014) – The Wolf And The Woods

References

External links 
 Official website
 Hand of Glory Records

English women singers
Living people
Place of birth missing (living people)
Year of birth missing (living people)
English women in electronic music
English electronic musicians
British autoharp players